Kapala is a genus of parasitic wasps in the family Eucharitidae, found primarily in the neotropics, and associated with ants.

References

Hymenoptera genera
Chalcidoidea